Harvey Wallace Schiller (born April 30, 1940) is an American sports executive whose many varied positions have included Executive Director of the United States Olympic Committee, Chief Executive Officer of YankeeNets, President of Turner Sports, head of the International Baseball Federation and President of the Atlanta Thrashers.  He has been named several times as one of the “100 Most Powerful People in Sports” by Sporting News.

Early life

A native of the Flatbush neighborhood of Brooklyn, New York he attended Erasmus Hall High School and  The Citadel in Charleston, South Carolina where he earned a bachelor's degree in Chemistry and played football; one of his Assistant Coaches was Al Davis, the future owner of the Oakland Raiders. Commissioned into the United States Air Force he attended pilot training and flew more than a thousand sorties on the C-123 Provider in South Vietnam winning the Distinguished Flying Cross; after earning Masters and Doctoral Degrees in Chemistry from the University of Michigan he would spend most of his military career as a Professor and Head of the Chemistry Department at the United States Air Force Academy, eventually retiring as a Brigadier General.

Career 

His sports management career began in 1986 when he was appointed Commissioner for the Southeastern Conference of the National Collegiate Athletic Association, in 1990 he was appointed Executive Director of the United States Olympic Committee and oversaw a dramatic restructuring of the organization that lead to increased support for athletes and introduction of drug testing; he instituted cash awards for medal winners, oversaw a major renovation of the Olympic Training Center in Colorado Springs, Colorado, added new corporate sponsorships and dealt with issues like the famous rivalry between Nancy Kerrigan and Tonya Harding.  He was also instrumental in landing the 1996 Summer Games for Atlanta and the 2002 Winter Games for Salt Lake City.

In 1994 business mogul Ted Turner tapped him to become the first President of Turner Sports, a fledgling TV sports operation that produces game telecasts for Turner Network Television and TBS; he oversaw a dramatic expansion that included creation of Turner South.  As the executive in charge of World Championship Wrestling he was the supervisor of Eric Bischoff, then-president of WCW; in a famous appearance on  the wrestling show WCW Monday Nitro he suspended Bischoff from WCW on March 3, 1997. In 1997 Schiller also concurrently became President of the Atlanta Thrashers, an expansion franchise of the National Hockey League.

In 1999 George Steinbrenner selected Schiller to become CEO of YankeeNets, a conglomerate that owned the New York Yankees of Major League Baseball, the New Jersey Nets of the National Basketball Association and the New Jersey Devils of the National Hockey League. He was instrumental in creating the YES Network (Yankee Entertainment and Sports Network), a regional cable and sports channel that currently broadcasts games for the Yankees, Brooklyn Nets and New York City FC of Major League Soccer; it is now worth an estimated $3 Billion.
From 2007-2009 he served as President of the International Baseball Federation, an organization that manages and sets policy for the sport of baseball, it also lobbied for inclusion of the sport in the Olympic Games.  During his tenure a controversial rule about how extra innings are played was adopted, it became known as the “Schiller Rule”; he was also appointed to the Advisory Board of the Baseball Hall of Fame.
Schiller next served as Chairman of the unsuccessful bid by New York City to host the 2012 Olympics, he was also appointed to the Women and Sports Commission of the International Olympic Committee. In 2010 he was named to the America’s Cup Advisory Board and in 2014 was appointed first Commercial Commissioner; a position responsible for managing, marketing and site selection of the 2017 races held in Bermuda. From 2014 to 2018 Schiller served as Board of Directors President for USA Team Handball.

In recent years Schiller has also become involved in several consulting ventures including service as Chairman of Assante, USA; which provides life and financial management products; in 2005 he started the GlobalOptions Group, an international risk management and business solutions company. He has been Chairman of Collegiate Sports Management Group and Vice Chairman for Digital Media, Entertainment and Sports Practice of Diversified Search as well as serving on the advisory boards of Mesa Air Group and Walker Innovation.

Recognition 

He has been awarded Honorary Doctorates by The Citadel, Northern Michigan University and the United States Sports Academy.  He is a member of The Citadel Athletic and Business Halls of Fame and was awarded the prestigious Olympic Order by the International Olympic Committee.  In 2013 he was honored as one of the “Pioneers and Innovators in Sports Business” by Sports Business Journal.

References 

1940 births
Living people
Baseball executives
The Citadel Bulldogs football players
People from Flatbush, Brooklyn
Southeastern Conference commissioners
Recipients of the Distinguished Flying Cross (United States)
Recipients of the Legion of Merit
World Championship Wrestling executives